Vladan Kovačević (born 11 April 1998) is Serb professional footballer who plays as a goalkeeper for Ekstraklasa club Raków Częstochowa.

Kovačević started his professional career at Sarajevo, who loaned him to Sloboda Mrkonjić Grad in 2018. Three years later, he joined Raków Częstochowa.

Club career

Sarajevo
Kovačević started playing football at his howetown club Željezničar Banja Luka, before joining Sarajevo's youth academy in 2014.

In February 2018, he was sent on a six-month loan to Sloboda Mrkonjić Grad. He made his professional debut against Kozara Gradiška on 17 March at the age of 19.

In August, Kovačević signed a new five-year deal with Sarajevo. On 5 August, he made his official debut for the team against Sloboda Tuzla. He won his first title with the club on 15 May 2019, by beating Široki Brijeg in Bosnian Cup final.

Raków Częstochowa

In June 2021, Kovačević was transferred to Polish outfit Raków Częstochowa for an undisclosed fee. He made his competitive debut for the club in 2021 Polish Super Cup game against Legia Warsaw on 17 July and managed to win his first trophy. A week later, he made his league debut against Piast Gliwice.

In July 2022, he extended his contract until June 2026.

International career

Youth 
Kovačević was a member of Bosnia and Herzegovina under-21 team under coach Vinko Marinović.

Senior 
In May 2019, he received his first senior Bosnia and Herzegovina call-up, for UEFA Euro 2020 qualifiers against Finland and Italy.

In February 2023, Kovačević accepted an invitation to the Serbian national football team and is expected to make his debut in March.

Personal life
Kovačević married his long-time girlfriend Sofija in June 2022. Together they have a daughter named Zona.

Career statistics

Club

Honours
Sarajevo
Bosnian Premier League: 2018–19, 2019–20
Bosnian Cup: 2018–19, 2020–21

Raków Częstochowa
Polish Cup: 2021–22
Polish Super Cup: 2021, 2022

References

External links

1998 births
Living people
Sportspeople from Banja Luka
Serbs of Bosnia and Herzegovina
Bosnia and Herzegovina footballers
Bosnia and Herzegovina under-21 international footballers
Bosnia and Herzegovina expatriate footballers
Naturalized citizens of Serbia
Serbian footballers
Association football goalkeepers
FK Sarajevo players
FK Sloboda Mrkonjić Grad players
Raków Częstochowa players
First League of the Republika Srpska players
Premier League of Bosnia and Herzegovina players
Ekstraklasa players
Expatriate footballers in Poland
Bosnia and Herzegovina expatriate sportspeople in Poland
Serbian expatriate sportspeople in Poland